Hello Love is the third album by The Be Good Tanyas, released in 2006. Two tracks on the CD include guest musicians Old Crow Medicine Show.

Track listing

References

2006 albums
The Be Good Tanyas albums